Saheli Rochana Gamage (born March 8, 1988) is a Sri Lankan singer, political eulogist and a doctor. She holds the title "Visharada". She is noted for her popular political song titled 'Ayubowewa, Maharajanani' (Great King long life to you) which is devoted to a Sri Lankan President, Mahinda Rajapaksa and the three Armed Forces and police who fought in the Sri Lankan Civil War.

References

External links

21st-century Sri Lankan women singers
Sri Lankan Buddhists
Living people
1988 births
Sinhalese singers